Camille Godart station is located on ligne  of the tramway de Bordeaux.

Situation
The station is located on Emile Counord avenue in Bordeaux.

Junctions
 Buses of the TBC:

Close by
 Église Notre-Dame des Chartrons

See also
 TBC
 Tramway de Bordeaux

Bordeaux tramway stops
Tram stops in Bordeaux
Railway stations in France opened in 2007